Tetrazzini is an Italian-American dish made with diced poultry or seafood and mushrooms in a butter, cream or milk and cheese sauce flavored with sherry or white wine, and combined with linguine, spaghetti, egg noodles, or other types of pasta, sometimes topped with breadcrumbs or cheese, and garnished with parsley or basil.

The dish is named after the Italian opera star Luisa Tetrazzini. The origins of tetrazzini are widely disputed. Some accounts ascribe tetrazzini as a creation of Auguste Escoffier. Other sources claim tetrazzini to be invented in the early 1900s by Ernest Arterrbogast, the chef at the Palace Hotel in San Francisco, California, where Luisa Tetrazzini made her American debut at the Tivoli as Gilda in Rigoletto on January 11, 1905. However, other sources attribute the origin to the Knickerbocker Hotel in New York City.

In 1950s through the 1980s, upscale New York City restaurants including Mamma Leone's and Sardi's featured tetrazzini on the menu  Sardi's tetrazzini recipe was featured in Vincent Price's cookbook, A Treasury of Great Recipes  and mentioned in the Sue Kaufman novel, Diary of a Mad Housewife. Tetrazzini frozen dinners were popular in the 1960s, as noted by Joan Didion in The Saturday Evening Post article, "The Big Rock Candy Figgy Pudding Pitfall." Recipes for tetrazzini, both from-scratch and using convenience ingredients, were popular in the 1950s and 1960s, and the dish was featured in an episode of Mad Men. The Unofficial Mad Men Cookbook, a collection of vintage recipes featuring dishes featured in the run of the show. The cookbook included recipes drawn from various popular mid-century restaurants and cookbooks, including a recipe for tetrazzini originally published in Betty Crocker's Hostess Cookbook. In the 1960s, southern restaurants and Junior League cookbooks began featuring versions of tetrazzini (often referred to as chicken spaghetti throughout the south). In the 1960s, the famed Piccadilly Cafeteria in Baton Rouge introduced chicken tetrazzini to the menu, and it remains a customer favorite decades later. Foster's Market in Durham, North Carolina introduced chicken spaghetti to their in-house dining and catering menus in the 1980s, with their version based upon the chicken spaghetti recipe featured in the Baton Rouge Junior League cookbook, River Road Recipes. In the 1990s, tetrazzini and chicken spaghetti emerged as soul food classics.

Tetrazzini in 21st Century Pop Culture

Tetrazzini, specifically chicken tetrazzini, became an Internet meme after a woman on Maury accuses her friend of seducing her boyfriend by preparing his favorite meal, chicken tetrazzini. Clips from the episode were featured on the E! channel show, The Soup, in 2007. In 2020, Vice magazine food editor Farideh Sadeghin prepared chicken tetrazzini for their Munchies series, referencing the Maury episode as her inspiration for the dish.

See also
 List of casserole dishes
 List of foods named after people

References 

Casserole dishes
Food and drink in the San Francisco Bay Area
Cuisine of New York City
Foods featuring butter
Pasta dishes
Cheese dishes
Mushroom dishes
American poultry dishes
American seafood dishes
Soul food
Cuisine of the Southern United States
Italian-American cuisine
Louisiana Creole cuisine